Loaded With Zoul is the debut album by the Estonian duo Malcolm Lincoln, released 20 May 2010 on Universal Music. The release date coincides with frontman Robin Juhkental's birthday.

The album was produced by Vaiko Eplik and Robin Juhkental, mixed by Siim Mäesalu, and mastered at Finnvox Studios. The record was physically released in the Baltic States and Scandinavia, but is also available as a digital download internationally.

Two singles were released from the album: "Siren" and "Loaded With Zoul".

Robin Juhkental has described the album as "electronic music, but in the style of the 1960s and 70s".

Track listing
All songs written by Robin Juhkental, except track 4, written by Reigo Vilbiks and Robin Juhkental.

References

2010 debut albums
Universal Music Group albums
Malcolm Lincoln albums
Albums produced by Vaiko Eplik